Martine Bellen is an American poet, editor and librettist.

Career
She has taught at Milton Avery Graduate School of the Arts, New York University, Rutgers University, and Hofstra University. She is currently teaching at Rachel Carson Intermediate School
She was writer in residence at University of Central Oklahoma.
She was a contributing editor of the literary journal Conjunctions, and Web del Sol.

Awards
 New York Foundation for the Arts
 Fund for Poetry
 American Academy of Poets Award
 1997 National Poetry Series Award, for Tales of Murasaki and Others Poems

Works

Poetry
 "Renga", Conjunctions 21, Fall 1993
 "Calamity Jane", Web Del Sol
 "For the Living: A Chapbook", The Drunken Boat

 
 Further Adventures of the Monkey God. Spuyten Duyvil.
 
   (chapbook)
 
 GHOSTS! Spuyten Duyvil. 2011.
 Magic Musée, bilingual collection of her poetry, published in Germany by Verlag im Waldgut (translator, Hans Jürgen Balmes)

Novella
2X (Squared). BlazeVOX Books. 2010.

Opera Libretto
 Ovidiana, an opera based on Ovid’s Metaporphoses (composer, Matthew Greenbaum) that has been performed in New York City and Philadelphia.
 Ah! Opera No-Opera, composer David Rosenboom, performed at REDCAT on September 16, 17 & 18, 2009

Anthologies

References

External links
"Author's website"
"Martine Bellen", Here Comes Everybody'', February 12, 2005

Living people
University of Central Oklahoma faculty
New York University faculty
Rutgers University faculty
American women poets
20th-century American poets
Place of birth missing (living people)
Year of birth missing (living people)
21st-century American poets
20th-century American women writers
21st-century American women writers
American women academics